The 2018 Iowa State Cyclones football team represented Iowa State University in the 2018 NCAA Division I FBS football season. Competing as a member of the Big 12 Conference (Big 12), the team played its home games at Jack Trice Stadium in Ames, Iowa. They were led by third-year head coach Matt Campbell. They finished the season 8–5, 6–3 in the Big 12, which was the most conference wins in a season in program history. They finished third in the Big 12, behind No. 4 Oklahoma and No. 14 Texas. They were invited to the Alamo Bowl where they lost to No. 13 Washington State.

Previous season and offseason

The 2017 Iowa State Cyclones football team finished 7–5 in the regular season and 5–4 in Big 12 play giving them a fourth-place finish in conference standings. Allen Lazard, Kamari Cotton-Moya, and David Montgomery received first team All-Big 12 honors and Jake Campos, Chase Allen, Joel Lanning, Brian Peavy, and JD Waggoner received second team All-Big 12 honors. Matt Campbell was also named Big 12 Coach of the Year. Additionally, Joel Lanning was named a first team All-American.

Departures

2018 recruiting class

Incoming transfers

Award watch lists
Listed in the order that they were released

Big 12 media poll
The Big 12 media poll was released on July 12, 2018 with the Cyclones predicted to finish in seventh place.

Schedule
Iowa State announced their 2018 football schedule on October 26, 2017. The 2018 schedule consisted of seven home games and five away games in the regular season.  The Cyclones hosted Big 12 foes Oklahoma, West Virginia, Texas Tech, Baylor, and Kansas State and travel to TCU, Oklahoma State, Kansas, and Texas. For their non-conference schedule the Cyclones hosted Drake and Akron as well as traveling to in–state rival Iowa.

Originally, Iowa State planned to play South Dakota State on September 1 to open the season, however, the game was canceled shortly after kickoff due to bad weather. Iowa State was to host Incarnate Word on December 1, however, Incarnate Word was not able to play after qualifying for the FCS playoffs. They replaced Incarnate Word with Drake.

Personnel

Roster

Coaching staff

Game summaries

Game 1: at Iowa Hawkeyes

Game 2: Oklahoma Sooners

Game 3: Akron Zips

Game 4: at TCU Horned Frogs

Game 5: at Oklahoma State Cowboys

Iowa State's Freshman Brock Purdy replaced Zeb Noland at quarterback and passed 18-for-23 for 318 yards and produced four touchdowns. He then ran for another 84 yards and another score.  The final score was a loss for the Cowboys at 48-42.

Game 6: West Virginia Mountaineers

Game 7: Texas Tech Red Raiders

Game 8: at Kansas Jayhawks

Game 9: Baylor Bears

At the beginning of the second half, Baylor's Chris Miller got a flag for a late hit against Iowa State running back David Montgomery, pushing him into a Gatorade cooler, escalating tensions. Later, Baylor linebacker Greg Roberts threw a punch at Montgomery and he responded with another punch. Both were ejected from the second half of the game and Montgomery was ejected from the first half of the Texas game the following week.

Game 10: at Texas Longhorns

Game 11: Kansas State Wildcats

After a slow start, Kansas State held a solid lead for most of the game.  Kansas State had racked up a 17 point lead with only 12 minutes remaining in the game.  From there, Iowa State's Mike Rose grabbed a loose ball for a touchdown and the Cyclones controlled the game to rally with 21 unanswered points.  The final score was an Iowa State victory, 41-38. The Cyclones broke the 9 year losing streak against the Wildcats. This game was also the last game Kansas State coach Bill Snyder coached before retiring.

Game 12: Drake Bulldogs

Game 13: Washington State Cougars

Statistics

Scoring
Scores against non-conference opponents

Scores against the Big 12

Scores against all opponents

Rankings

Awards and honors

Players drafted into the NFL

TV ratings

All totals via Sports Media Watch. Streaming numbers not included. † - Data not available.

References

Iowa State
Iowa State Cyclones football seasons
Iowa State Cyclones football